Cathedral of St. John the Theologian may refer to:
 Cathedral of St. John the Theologian, Nicosia
 Cathedral of St. John the Theologian (Tenafly, New Jersey)